Voice Fantasy is a 2010 action game developed and published by Square Enix and released for the Apple iOS platforms. The game centers on battles between the player's army and enemy monsters or computer-controlled players. The characters in the army are generated using the sounds of the player's own voice, and then engage in side-scrolling combat with the enemy. The game was created in concert with Koto Laboratories, and was announced on Facebook one week prior to release. It was critically panned by reviewers, who praised for its novel concept but dismissed the title as a short-lived gimmick with very little gameplay or replayability.

Gameplay 

Voice Fantasy consists of fighting an enemy by sending an army of customized characters to fight against them. The game contains three modes of play; "Single Match", where players battle other players, "Tag Match" where they battle in groups of two, and the primary "Demon King" mode, where monsters are battled instead. Once battle commences, all battle actions and commands are automated. The game is single-player only; matches against other "players" are held against computer-controlled heroes.

The player starts by creating characters to fight for them; they do so by speaking any word into the microphone to build the character on. Based on the pitch of the player's voice, rather than the word said, a character will be created with different levels of eight different combat attributes such as abilities, personality, and jobs such as a warrior or a mage. As the characters players have created attack, they repeat the sound or words the player used to create them, sometimes using a different pitch level. The game holds up to 50 characters, and characters can be saved or deleted after each round of combat. Battles take place in a side-on view. Other than creating the initial characters, the player has no control over their actions or the rest of the game.

Development 
Developer studios Koto Laboratories contributed to the software development and sound implementation. On February 22, 2010, Square Enix registered a trademark for Voice Fantasy. Some excitement and discussion preceded the release of the game, when a week before its release, Square Enix posted on their Facebook page that they were releasing a game allowing players to create characters with their voices, and some speculated it was related to a previously released game called Song Summoners. The game was released on iOS on November 1, 2010. On February 18, 2011, the game was updated so that players could play as any of the three main characters from the highly acclaimed video game Secret of Mana.

Reception 

Two major concerns of reviewers were the lack of ability by the player to participate in combat, and prevent any mistakes by the in game AI, and the inability of the characters to gain a higher level through experience points like other role playing games, making any weak skilled characters not worth playing with at all. IGN referred to the game as a tech demo, citing its lack of extensive gameplay or story, and rated the game 5/10, or "Mediocre". Reviewers cited that other than brief laughter with friends at the strange or obscene things they got their characters to say, the length of gameplay could be measured in minutes. TouchArcade classified it as on the border between a game and an entertainment app because of its brevity and its lack of interactivity, but recommended it for playing in the presence of friends to show the iPhones unique gaming capabilities. Pocket Gamer, on the other hand, said that it "can be described as more a microphone tech demo than serious game", and felt that there was so little gameplay involved in the app that "it's questionable it even deserves to be called a game".

The game was praised for its novelty by The Escapist, who approved of Square Enix's attempt to create a game specifically using the strengths of the game system it was making games for, and also trying something new instead of more efforts at porting older games. The graphics were also praised for their retro and colorful graphics style, and was named "App of the Day" by The Unofficial Apple Blog. It has also been noted that the spells, monsters, names and music of the game do not come from any established Final Fantasy game, making the "Fantasy" title feel "tacked on." Both the TouchArcade and 148Apps reviews stated that the game was better as an app to show the player's friends the interesting concept than as a game to play.

References

External links 
Official site

2010 video games
Square Enix games
IOS games
IOS-only games
Video games developed in Japan